Eutreta christophe is a species of fruit fly in the family Tephritidae.

Distribution
Mexico, Haiti.

References

Tephritinae
Insects described in 1933
Diptera of North America